Jeff or Jeffrey Williams may refer to:

Entertainment
 Jeff Williams (actor), American actor
 Jeff Williams (musician) (born 1950), American jazz drummer
 Jeff Williams, soundtrack composer and musician for Red vs. Blue and RWBY
 Jeffery Lamar Williams, aka Young Thug (born 1991), rapper from Atlanta, Georgia
 J. Allen Williams (born 1960), American animator and writer

Sports
 Jeff Williams (cyclist) (born 1958), British Olympic cyclist
 Jeff Williams (sprinter) (born 1965), American track and field athlete
 Jeff Williams (baseball) (born 1972), Australian baseball pitcher in the United States and Japan
 Jeff Williams (ice hockey) (born 1976), Canadian former professional ice hockey player
 Jeff Williams (tennis) (born 1978), American tennis player	
 Jeff Williams (rugby union) (born 1988), South African rugby player
 Jeff Williams (offensive lineman), American football offensive lineman
 Jeff Williams (running back), American football running back

Other
 Jeffrey Williams (astronaut) (born 1958), American astronaut
 Jeffrey Williams (fashion designer) (born 1984), American fashion designer
 Jeff Williams (poker player) (born 1986), American poker player
 Jeff Williams (Apple), Chief Operating Officer, Apple Inc.
 Jeff Williams (politician), mayor of Arlington, Texas
 Jeffrey L. Williams, arrested during the Ferguson unrest of March 2015
 Jeffrey S. Williams, writer, Civil War historian
 Jeffrey T. Williams, American ichthyologist.

See also 
 Geoff Williams (disambiguation)
 Jeffery Williams, Canadian military officer
 Jeffery–Williams Prize, a mathematics award